The men's triple jump event at the 2015 European Athletics Indoor Championships was held on 6 March 2015 at 10:00 (qualification) and 7 March, 18:40 (final) local time.

Medalists

Records

Results

Qualification
Qualification: Qualification Performance 16.75 (Q) or at least 8 best performers advanced to the final.

Final

References

2015 European Athletics Indoor Championships
Triple jump at the European Athletics Indoor Championships